The Shubi (also called Washubi) are a Bantu ethnic and linguistic group based in Ngara District of Kagera Region, Tanzania; that speak the Shubi language.  In 1987 the Shubi population was estimated to number 153,000. They were traditionally hunters but now are predominantly agriculturalists.

References

Ethnic groups in Tanzania
Indigenous peoples of East Africa